Akner is a village in the Goris Municipality of the Syunik Province in Armenia.

Etymology 
The village was previously known as Brun.

Demographics 
The Statistical Committee of Armenia reported its population as 1,338 in 2010, up from 1,116 at the 2001 census.

References 

Populated places in Syunik Province